Jack Bridge (born 21 September 1995) is an English professional footballer who plays as a midfielder for Southend United.

Career
Bridge began his career with Southend United at the age of nine and signed his first professional contract with the club in April 2014. Bridge went on loan to Soham Town Rangers in November 2014 and experienced his first taste of first team football, scoring two goals in five starts in his time at the club. After it was reported that Bridge was on the radar of clubs bigger in stature than Soham, Bridge signed for Chelmsford City in January 2015 on an initial one-month loan deal which was later extended to the end of the season. On 22 January 2016, Bridge returned to Chelmsford City alongside fellow Southend loanee Jason Williams. Bridge scored, assisted and was named Man of the Match on his return to the club in a 4–3 win against Whitehawk a day later.

On 30 April 2016, Bridge made his debut for Southend United in a 1–0 loss against Bradford City as a substitute for Glen Kamara. On 9 May 2016, Bridge signed a two-year contract extension at Southend United.

In January 2017, Bridge began training with Bournemouth ahead of a possibility of a permanent transfer to the club.

On 5 January 2018, Bridge joined Northampton Town for an undisclosed fee. On 6 May 2019, Northampton announced Bridge was amongst eight players to be released prior to the start of the next season. A month later he joined fellow League Two side Carlisle United on a one-year deal.

In August 2020, Bridge played in pre-season on trials for both Bristol Rovers and Southend United.

On 30 October 2020, Bridge signed for National League South side Concord Rangers.

On 23 January 2021, Bridge signed for National League side Bromley.

On 9 June 2021, Bridge re-signed for National League side Southend United

Career statistics

Southend United

References

1995 births
Living people
English footballers
Sportspeople from Southend-on-Sea
Association football forwards
Southend United F.C. players
English Football League players
Chelmsford City F.C. players
Bromley F.C. players
Soham Town Rangers F.C. players
Northampton Town F.C. players
National League (English football) players
Association football midfielders
People from Southend-on-Sea